In mathematics, the Puppe sequence is a construction of homotopy theory, so named after Dieter Puppe. It comes in two forms: a long exact sequence, built from the mapping fibre (a fibration), and a long coexact sequence, built from the mapping cone (which is a cofibration). Intuitively, the Puppe sequence allows us to think of homology theory as a functor that takes spaces to long-exact sequences of groups. It is also useful as a tool to build long exact sequences of relative homotopy groups.

Exact Puppe sequence 
Let  be a continuous map between pointed spaces and let  denote the mapping fibre (the fibration dual to the mapping cone). One then obtains an exact sequence:

where the mapping fibre is defined as:

Observe that the loop space  injects into the mapping fibre: , as it consists of those maps that both start and end at the basepoint .  One may then show that the above sequence extends to the longer sequence

The construction can then be iterated to obtain the exact Puppe sequence

The exact sequence is often more convenient than the coexact sequence in practical applications, as Joseph J. Rotman explains:
(the) various constructions (of the coexact sequence) involve quotient spaces instead of subspaces, and so all maps and homotopies require more scrutiny to ensure that they are well-defined and continuous.

Examples

Example: Relative homotopy
As a special case, one may take X to be a subspace A of Y that contains the basepoint y0, and f to be the inclusion  of A into Y.  One then obtains an exact sequence in the category of pointed spaces:

One may then show that 

is in bijection to the relative homotopy group , thus giving rise to the relative homotopy sequence of pairs

Example: Fibration
As a special case, one may take f to be a fibration . Then the mapping fiber Mp has the homotopy lifting property and it follows that Mp and the fiber  have the same homotopy type. It follows trivially that maps of the sphere into Mp are homotopic to maps of the sphere to F, that is, 

From this, the Puppe sequence gives the homotopy sequence of a fibration:

Example: Weak fibration
Weak fibrations are strictly weaker than fibrations, however, the main result above still holds, although the proof must be altered.

.

This bijection can be used in the relative homotopy sequence above, to obtain the homotopy sequence of a weak fibration, having the same form as the fibration sequence, although with a different connecting map.

Coexact Puppe sequence 
Let  be a continuous map between CW complexes and let  denote a mapping cone of f, (i.e., the cofiber of the map f), so that we have a (cofiber) sequence:

.

Now we can form  and  suspensions of A and B respectively, and also  (this is because suspension might be seen as a functor), obtaining  a sequence:

.

Note that suspension preserves cofiber sequences.

Due to this powerful fact we know that  is homotopy equivalent to  By collapsing  to a point, one has a natural map  Thus we have a sequence:

 

Iterating this construction, we obtain the Puppe sequence associated to :

Some properties and consequences
It is a simple exercise in topology to see that every three elements of a Puppe sequence are, up to a homotopy, of the form:

 .

By "up to a homotopy", we mean here that every 3 elements in a Puppe sequence are of the above form if regarded as objects and morphisms in the homotopy category.

A result, due to John Milnor, is that if one takes the Eilenberg–Steenrod axioms for homology theory, and replaces excision by the exact sequence of a weak fibration of pairs, then one gets the homotopy analogy of the Eilenberg–Steenrod theorem: there exists a unique sequence of functors  with P the category of all pointed pairs of topological spaces.

Remarks
As there are two "kinds" of suspension, unreduced and reduced, one can also consider unreduced and reduced Puppe sequences (at least if dealing with pointed spaces, when it's possible to form reduced suspension).

References

 Edwin Spanier, Algebraic Topology, Springer-Verlag (1982) Reprint, McGraw Hill (1966)

Homotopy theory